Galeazzo Dondi (19 March 1915 – 23 October 2004) was an Italian basketball player. He competed in the 1936 Summer Olympics.

References

1915 births
2004 deaths
Italian men's basketball players
Olympic basketball players of Italy
Basketball players at the 1936 Summer Olympics
Sportspeople from Bologna